The Men's sprint competition at the 2019 FIL World Luge Championships was held on 25 January 2019.

Results
The qualification was held at 11:44 and the final at 15:33.

References

Men's sprint